In mathematics of special functions, the Neuman–Sándor mean M, of two positive and unequal numbers a and b, is defined as:

 

This mean interpolates the inequality of the unweighted arithmetic mean A = (a + b)/2) and of the second Seiffert mean T defined as:

 

so that A < M < T.

The M(a,b) mean, introduced by Edward Neuman and József Sándor, has recently been the subject of intensive research and many remarkable inequalities for this mean can be found in the literature. Several authors obtained sharp and optimal bounds for the Neuman–Sándor mean. Neuman and others utilized this mean to study other bivariate means and inequalities.

See also

 Mean
 Arithmetic mean
 Geometric mean
 Stolarsky mean
 Identric mean
 Means in Mathematical Analysis

References

Means
Special functions